Beroe is a Bulgarian professional association football club based in Stara Zagora, that competes in the First League, the top division of the Bulgarian football league system. The club was founded in 1916 under the name Vereya. The club's colours are green and white.

Since then the home ground of Beroe has been the homonymous Stadion Beroe in Stara Zagora with a seating capacity of 12,128. Beroe were the 1986 champions of Bulgaria and they also won the Bulgarian Cup twice in 2010 and 2013. In terms of international achievements, Beroe hold the record for Balkans Cups titles, having won the tournament four times. The club's most noted and successful player is Petko Petkov, 2 times A Group Top Scorer: 1974 (with 20 goals) and 1976 (with 19 goals).

History

Football was played in Stara Zagora as early as 1916, however with no organized championship in Bulgaria until the late 1920s, numerous clubs enjoyed regional success in those early years for the game in both the city and Bulgaria itself. Beroe can trace its roots back to 4 May 1924, when it was founded as Beroya, after the merger of two other clubs – Borislav and Rekord.

The club withstood the almost constant chaos and strife of the times, often caused by numerous shifts in the political regimes of Bulgaria, and despite many mergers and name changes throughout the first four decades of its history, it is constantly among the top 3 clubs in the city. It has also often been the platform for attempts to unite all the clubs in Stara Zagora, which foreshadowed its role and meaning for the city in the years to come.

The establishment of an organized league to determine the champion of Bulgaria in the late 40s coincided with the consolidation of football in Stara Zagora, the city finally seeing a one single strong club emerge to represent it at the highest level of Bulgarian football. That club was Beroe, at first bearing the names of Udarnik and Botev, before finally restoring its old name in 1959.

Successful years 1968–1980
1968 marked the beginning of Beroe's golden age. During the summer transfer period, the forward Petko Petkov joined the club. In the next 12 years he scored 144 goals for the club in A Group. Beroe became all-powerful, winning the Balkans Cup in 1968 (beating in the final Spartak Sofia with a 6–4 on aggregate) and 1969 (beating Dinamo Tirana with a 4–0 on aggregate). However in 1970 the team was relegated after being excluded from the championship after 18 rounds due to crowd trouble in the match with Levski.

Bouncing back after a year, season 1971–72 in the domestic league was very successful for the team, which finished 3rd, and qualified for the UEFA Cup. The club's first participation in UEFA Cup was also promising, with Beroe eliminating the Austrian Austria Wien (7–0 and 3–1) and the Hungarian Honvéd (3–0 and 0–1) respectively and reaching the third round (but being knocked out by the Yugoslav OFK Beograd).

In season 1973–74 Beroe reach the quarter-finals of the Cup Winners' Cup: after eliminating the Luxembourg Fola Esch and the Basques of Athletic Bilbao, they were stopped in DDR by 1. FC Magdeburg (2–0 and 1–1).

Beroe have had some success in Europe, such as the 1–0 win over Juventus in a Cup Winners' Cup first-leg in 1979 and a 3–0 win over Athletic Bilbao in 1973. Moreover, Beroe is one of the two Bulgarian football clubs that has a positive record of the matches played in European club competitions.

Champions 1980–1995

In 1982 and 1984 Beroe won the Balkans Cup for the third and fourth times.

In 1986, the team led by the coach Evgeni Yanchovski won the Bulgarian title, the first in the club's history. Beroe finished the season with 43 points (after 20 wins, 4 draws and 6 losses).  Beroe played in the 1986–87 UEFA European Champions Cup where they were eliminated in the first round to Dynamo Kyiv of the Soviet Union after 1–1 at Beroe Stadium and 0–2 loss in Kyiv.

The 1990s would see a gradual decline as Beroe were relegated to B Group in season 1994–95, finishing in last place with twelve points.

Downfall of the mid 90s, ups and downs again 1995–2008
The advent of democracy in Bulgaria ushered a new period of chaos and economical hardship for the country, and that didn't pass by Beroe. Nevertheless, despite several seasons of crisis the club again withstood the test of time, and despite needing a helpful merger with another team – Olimpik (Teteven) – remained a key player on the Bulgarian football scene.

The first two seasons back in top division saw Beroe fight relegation, with safety being achieved by second-half runs.  In 2001–02 season the team again relegated.

In the autumn of 2007 the actual majority shareholder of Professional Football Club Beroe JSCo Nikolay Banev gave up the financial support of the team. In spite of that, the team demonstrated good football in most of the games. On the 10th of January, 2008 23 players and 3 coaches terminated their contracts with the club after a planned sale of the shares had failed.

Beroe got out of trouble on the 3rd of February 2008, when the Beroe veterans’ club and the national fanclub, assisted by lawyer Damian Georgiev initiated, through related firms, insolvency proceedings in respect of the club in the Regional Court of Stara Zagora. The appointed administrator Elka Petrova transferred all the assets and liabilities of the club to a newly established joint-stock company Professional Football Club Beroe Stara Zagora JSCo.

The new entity succeeded Professional Football Club Beroe JSCo as regard of the license, the membership in the Bulgarian Football Union and the running of the football team itself.

In the summer of 2009 due to the world economic crisis most of the shareholders left the club due to financial problems. The club's main sponsor Brikel JSCo transferred its shares to Beroe veterans’ club and the national fanclub, who appointed a new board of directors. It consists of Damyan Georgiev – Chairman, Genyo Petrov – Executive Director and Tsvetelin Zhoevski.

Winning the Cup 2009–10 and 2012–13
In the 2007–08 season Beroe lost their place in A Group, due to a controversial match between Belasitsa Petrich and Marek Dupnitsa in the last round of the season. In the very next season, however, Beroe won first place in B Group and returned to the top flight. At that time Ilian Iliev had already been manager of the club for the last 2 years. In the year to follow, Beroe achieved its best season in over 20 years, beating all of the main competitors for the Bulgarian Cup. Beroe eliminated CSKA Sofia in the quarter-finals, which paved the way for them to obtain the trophy, winning against second-division Chernomorets Pomorie 1–0 in the final at Lovech Stadium. The winning goal was scored dramatically in the last seconds of the added time by Beroe's former youth player Doncho Atanasov, who also went on to become top goalscorer of the tournament with 4 goals. Beroe became one of the only two Bulgarian teams that have won the cup without succeeding any goals. This success led to Ilian Iliev being awarded with the Coach of the Season award, as well as Ivo Ivanov (defender) being proclaimed best defender in A Group for 2009. Besides him other players that played a main role throughout the season were Iskren Pisarov, Georgi Andonov, Zdravko Iliev, Slavi Zhekov, Dian Genchev. One of the players with most matches in A Group for all times Kostadin Vidolov ended up his career mid-season with Beroe and went on to become a coach for Beroe's second team.

Beroe started 2010–11 season with the debut of the team in the UEFA Europa League. Beroe entered the competition in the third qualifying round and faced the Austrian side Rapid Wien. The game in Bulgaria ended in a 1–1 draw. Rapid Wien won the rematch with 3–0 putting an end to the international campaign of the Bulgarian team.

Beroe started 2012–13 season in Bulgarian Cup eliminating Akademik Svishtov in the second round.
In the quarter-finals Beroe eliminated Lokomotiv (Mezdra) with aggregate result of 8–1, and then Pirin (Gotse Delchev) in the quarter-finals and Slavia Sofia in the semi-finals. In the final match at Lovech Stadium in Lovech against Levski Sofia, the result after 90 minutes was 3–3. After Beroe had taken the lead with 3–1 in the 80th minute, Levski Sofia with 10 men restored the tie, after Hristo Yovov received a second yellow card in the end of the first half. At the penalty shoot-out Levski Sofia scored just 1 from 4 penalties and Beroe, 3 of 5 which meant that Beroe had won the cup for the second time in the club's history.

Shirt sponsors and manufacturers

Beroes colours are green and white.

Honours

Domestic
First League:
  Winners (1): 1985–86
  Runners-up (1): 2014–15
  Third place (2): 1971–72, 2015–16

Bulgarian Cup:
  Winners (2): 2009–10, 2012–13
  Runners-up (4): 1968, 1973, 1979, 1980

Bulgarian Supercup:
  Winners (1): 2013
  Runners-up (1): 2010

Second League:
  Winners (9 - Record) : 1953, 1956, 1957, 1959–60, 1970–71, 1974–75, 1982–83, 2003–04, 2008–09

European

European Cup/Champions League
 Round of 32 (1): 1986–87

UEFA Cup/UEFA Europa League
 1/8 final (1): 1972–73
 1/16 final (1): 1980–81
 3rd qualifying round (1): 2010–11
 2nd qualifying round (3): 2013–14, 2015–16, 2016–17

Cup Winners' Cup
 1/4 final (1): 1973–74
 1/8 final (1): 1979–80

Balkans Cup
  Winners (4 - Record): 1967–68, 1969, 1981–83, 1983–84
  Runners-up (1): 1970

League positions

Players

Current squad

For recent transfers, see Transfers winter 2022–23.

Out on loan

Foreign players
Up to twenty foreign nationals can be registered and given a squad number for the first team in the Bulgarian First League, however only five non-EU nationals can be used during a match day. Those non-EU nationals with European ancestry can claim citizenship from the nation their ancestors came from. If a player does not have European ancestry he can claim Bulgarian citizenship after playing in Bulgaria for 5 years.

International players

European record

Matches

1 ex officio the team doesn't come or leave the field.
Notes
 Clubs which ultimately won the tournament in that same season are indicated in bold
 1983–84 Balkans Cup Winner decided on group stage
 QR: Qualifying Round

UEFA & IFFHS rankings

Club coefficients
This is the current 2016–17 UEFA coefficient:

Full list

Club world ranking
These are the IFFHS club's points as of 7 January 2016:	
	
Full list

Stadium

Beroe Stadium is situated in the northwestern part of Stara Zagora near the biggest park of the city – Ayazmoto, which is the biggest sport facility of the team. The team has also three training grounds, the Beroe stadium base includes also tennis facilities and covered training hall. Built in 1959, the stadium is currently being renovated and has around 13,000 seating places, most of which are covered. The stadium has its own gymnastics, acrobatics and boxing hall. There is also a table-tennis facility. The stadium's overall capacity is about 15,000. The Beroe stadium has the fastest athletics lane and was often used for such competitions. The biggest attendance was in 1986 when the team won the championship title and more than 40,000 spectators were celebrating together with the players.

Supporters and rivalries

The club has very strong support in the country. Their group is called Zara Boys.

Beroe's main rival is Botev Plovdiv. The match between these two teams is called Thracian Derby. They also have a strong rivalry with the two most popular teams in the country – Levski Sofia and CSKA Sofia. Other teams that are in bad relations with Beroe are Lokomotiv Plovdiv and especially Neftochimic Burgas.

The only team with which fans Zara Boys have a strong friendship is Etar Veliko Tarnovo.

Statistics and Records
Evgeni Yanchovski holds Beroe's overall appearance record – he played 341 matches over the course of 14 seasons from 1960 to 1974. This is also the record for League appearances. Beroe's all-time leading scorer is Petko Petkov, who scored 144 goals while at the club from 1968 to 1980. Beroe's biggest victory is 8–0 in A Group against Minyor Pernik in 1973–74 and Chernomorets Burgas Sofia in 2006–07. Beroe's 7–0 defeat of Austria Wien in 1972 was its largest Europe win. Beroe's heaviest defeat, 2–10, came against CSKA Sofia in 1991–92.
Players in bold are currently playing for the team. Statistic is correct as of match played 1 December 2021.

Managers

 Panayot Tanev (1953)
 Borislav Asparuhov (1954)
 Panayot Tanev (1955–59)
 Borislav Milenov (1959)
 Ivan Radoev (1959–64)
 Anastas Kovachev (1964–65)
 Manol Manolov (1965–66)
 Krum Milev (1966–67)
 Hristo Mladenov (1967–69)
 Anastas Kovachev (1969–70)
 Dimitar Grigorov (1970–71)
 Hristo Mladenov (1971–72)
 Lozan Kotsev (1972–73)
 Ivan Tanev (1973–74)
 Hristo Mladenov (1974–76)
 Georgi Berkov (1976)
 Ivan Manolov (1976–77)
 Ivan Tanev (1977–81)
 Vasil Ivanov (1981)
 Ivan Vutov (1981–82)
 Georgi Belchev (1982–83)
 Petko Petkov (1983–85)
 Evgeni Yanchovski (1985–87)
 Petko Petkov (1987–90)
 Panayot Panayotov (1990)
 Boris Angelov (1990–92)
 Petko Petkov (1992)
 Evgeni Yanchovski (1992–93)
 Tenyo Minchev (1993–95)
 Ivan Vutov (1995)
 Dragoljub Bekvalac (1999–00)
 Ventsislav Kepov (2000)
 Petko Petkov (2000–01)
 Tsvetomir Parvanov (2001)
 Ivan Vutov (2001)
 Ilia Iliev (2002)
 Venelin Sivriev (2002–03)
 Asparuh Nikodimov (2003–04)
 Ivan Vutov (2004–05)
 Hans Kodrić (2005)
 Petko Petkov (2005–06)
 Ilian Iliev (2006–07)
 Eduard Eranosyan (2007)
 Radoslav Zdravkov (2007)
 Nikolay Demirev (2007)
 Ilian Iliev (Feb 1, 2008 – July 12)
 Ivko Ganchev (July 1, 2012 – Oct 12)
 Petar Hubchev (Oct 18, 2012 – April 6, 2016)
 Plamen Lipenski (April 7, 2016 – May 31, 2016)
 Aleksandar Dimitrov (June 1, 2016 – October 17, 2016)
 Plamen Lipenski (October 20, 2016 – October 26, 2016)
 Ferario Spasov (October 26, 2016 – May 19, 2017)

Club officials

Board of Directors

First Team
{| class="wikitable" style="text-align: center"
|-
!colspan="2"|Management
|-
|align=left|Director of Football
|align=left| Ivko Ganchev
|-
|align=left|Administrator
|align=left| Tihomir Tenev
|-
!colspan="2"|Technical staff
|-
|align=left|Head Coach
|align=left| Nikolay Kirov
|-
|align=left|Assistant Coach
|align=left| Ivan Kochev
|-
|align=left|Assistant Coach
|align=left| Ivan Zhelev
|-
|align=left|Goalkeeper Coach
|align=left| Tihomir Todorov
|-
|align=left|Fitness Coach
|align=left| Atanas Nikolov
|-
!colspan="3"|Medical staff
|-
|align=left|Doctor
|align=left| Nikolay Borisov
|-
|align=left|Rehabilitator
|align=left| Kaloyan Ganev
|-
|align=left|Housekeeper
|align=left| Venelin Sivriev
|-
|-

Youth Academy
{| class="wikitable" style="text-align: center"
|-
!colspan="3"|Management
|-
|align=left|Director of Youth Academy
|align=left| Ivan Tsvetanov
|-
!colspan="2"|Scouting staff
|-
|align=left rowspan=1|Scout
|align=left|Boris Kirev
|-
!colspan="2"|Youth Coaches
|-
|align=left|U-19 Coach
|align=left| Veselin Penev
|-
|align=left|U-17 "Junior A" Coach
|align=left| Pavel Dimov
|-
|align=left|U-16 "Junior B" Coach
|align=left| Ivan Tsvetanov
|-
|align=left|U-15 "Kids A" Coach
|align=left| Danail Zhelyazkov
|-
|align=left|U-14 "Kids B" Coach
|align=left| Boyan Stoyanov
|-
|align=left|U-13 "Preparatory Group A" Coach
|align=left| Doncho Atanasov
|-
|align=left|U-12 "Preparatory Group B" Coach
|align=left| Venelin Sivriev
|-
|align=left|U-11 "Preparatory Group C" Coach
|align=left| Trifon Panev
|-
|align=left|U-10 "Preparatory Group D" Coach
|align=left| Stefan Dinev
|-
|align=left|U-9 "Preparatory Group E" Coach
|align=left| Veselin Penev
|-
|align=left|U-8 "Preparatory Group F" Coach
|align=left| Steliyan Evtimov
|-

Press service

References

External links
Official website

 
Association football clubs established in 1916
Football clubs in Bulgaria
PFC Beroe Stara Zagora
Phoenix clubs (association football)